XPS may refer to:

 X-ray photoelectron spectroscopy (XPS), also known as electron spectroscopy for chemical analysis (ESCA)
 Extruded polystyrene foam as insulation material
 Open XML Paper Specification (XPS or OpenXPS), an open royalty-free fixed-layout document format developed by Microsoft
 Transmit packet steering, a scaling technique for network traffic processing
 Dell XPS computers